The 2022 Chandernagore Municipal Corporation election will be held on 12 February 2022 to elect 33 members of the Chandernagore Municipal Corporation (CMC) which governs Chandernagore and Mankundu, the twin cities in the Hooghly district Indian state of West Bengal.

Schedule

Voter Statistics

Parties and alliances
Following is a list of political parties and alliances which contested in this election:

Candidates

Result

Party-wise Result

Ward-wise Result
The Ward-wise Results were announced by the West Bengal State Election Commission after the counting.

Bye-Elections

References

Local elections in West Bengal
C
Chandannagar
Chandannagar